Route 127 is a state highway in southwestern Connecticut, running entirely from Bridgeport to Trumbull.  It serves as a minor arterial, connecting all four major limited access highways in the Bridgeport area.

Route description

Route 127 begins at an intersection with Route 130 in southeastern Bridgeport and almost immediately intersects I-95.  It then heads north, roughly parallel to the Pequonnock River and Route 8, into Trumbull.  It intersects Route 8 just north of the Bridgeport-Trumbull town line and continues north, then turns northwest to intersect Route 15 and Route 25 in rapid succession.  It then continues northwest to end at an intersection with Route 111 in Trumbull.

History
White Plains Road was laid out to Pulpit Rock, in present-day Trumbull, in 1705.
Route 127 was commissioned in 1932 and originally ran from US 1 to its current northern terminus.  At an undetermined time before 1978, the southern terminus was truncated to the Huntington Turnpike (SR 730). It was extended south to US 1 in 1992, then further south to Route 130 in 1995.

Major intersections

References

External links

The USGenWeb Project, Fairfield County

Transportation in Fairfield County, Connecticut
127
Trumbull, Connecticut
Transportation in Bridgeport, Connecticut